Sengo is one of the Ndu languages of Sepik River region of northern Papua New Guinea. It is spoken in Sengo village, Burui/Kunai Rural LLG, East Sepik Province.

References

Languages of East Sepik Province
Ndu languages